Ninh Kiều is an urban district (quận) of Cần Thơ in the Mekong Delta region of Vietnam. Ninh Kiều is located at the centre of Cần Thơ.  Most of Cần Thơ's municipal offices are located here.

Ninh Kiều is located along the Bassac River. Its most attractive site is the wharf, along which there are several hotels and restaurants. The bridge, part of which collapsed during construction in 2007, and Cần Thơ Ferry connect Ninh Kiều with Bình Minh district, Vĩnh Long province. Ninh Kiều's population in 2004 was 209,274, and 304,175 in 2018, and it has an area of 29.22 km2.

Administration
The district has a total of 11 wards:

 Phường An Bình
 Phường An Cư
 Phường An Hoà
 Phường An Khánh
 Phường An Nghiệp
 Phường An Phú
 Phường Cái Khế
 Phường Hưng Lợi
 Phường Tân An
 Phường Thới Bình
 Phường Xuân Khánh

Notable people

Nguyễn Hiếu Trung Anh (born 1992), Vietnamese footballer

References

External links
 http://gis.chinhphu.vn/

Districts of Cần Thơ